Dhari Junction railway station  is a railway station serving in Amreli district of Gujarat State of India.  It is under Bhavnagar railway division of Western Railway Zone of Indian Railways. Passenger trains halt here.

References

Railway stations in Amreli district
Bhavnagar railway division
Railway junction stations in Gujarat